Following the 2008–2009 Israel–Gaza conflict, an international conference took place on 2 March 2009 in Sharm El-Sheikh, Egypt, where donor countries and international bodies pledged almost US$4.5 billion for humanitarian and reconstruction aid for the Gaza Strip. These funds bypassed Hamas, with the PA in collaboration with the donor community taking the lead in delivering and distributing the funds. Damage from the Israeli offensive was estimated to be almost $2 billion. However, actual transfers of aid had been beset by difficulties.

Pledges
Donors pledged US$4.481 billion at the Sharm el-Sheikh conference to help the Palestinian economy and rebuild the Gaza Strip. The biggest donor was Saudi Arabia with $1 billion, followed by the United States with $900 million, a third for humanitarian aid to the Gaza Strip and the rest to assist the Palestinian Authority of President Mahmoud Abbas. The conference was criticized by Iran.

Donations

Note, no entry in the "Donation worth (USD)" column indicates the amount is presently unknown.

Difficulties

Hamas confiscation and obstruction of aid
On 12 January, Hamas raided some 100 aid trucks entering Gaza, stole their contents and sold them to the highest bidders. On 20 January, gunmen from Hamas' armed wing seized 12 trucks loaded with humanitarian aid that had been donated by the Jordanian government to the Palestinians in the Gaza Strip, according to Jordanian and Palestinian Authority officials.

On 3 February, 3,500 blankets and over 400 food parcels were confiscated by Hamas police personnel from an UNRWA distribution center. On the following day, the UN Emergency Relief Coordinator demanded that the aid be returned immediately. In a separate incident on 5 February, Hamas seized 200 tons of food from UNRWA aid supplies. The following day, UNRWA suspended its activities in Gaza. Hamas issued a statement stating that the incident was a misunderstanding between the drivers of the trucks and had been resolved through direct contact with the UNRWA. On 9 February, UNRWA lifted the suspension on the movement of its humanitarian supplies into Gaza, after the Hamas authorities returned all of the aid supplies confiscated. 

Some local Gaza NGOs providing emergency aid stated that Hamas had ordered them to stop operating because it suspected they were affiliated with rival group Fatah.

Concerns of strengthening Hamas
Militant Islamist organization Hamas, which is the de facto governing body of the Gaza Strip, is boycotted by western countries as a terrorist organization. In an international conference on reconstructing Gaza, donors insisted that the aid money for the Gaza Strip must bypass Hamas. An administration official from the United States, which pledged $900 million in aid, said that none of the country's aid would go to Hamas, being funneled instead through United Nations groups and non-governmental organizations. However, congresspersons expressed concern that some money would fall into the hands of Hamas. "To route $900 million to this area, and let's say Hamas was only able to steal 10 percent of that, we would still become Hamas' second-largest funder after Iran," said Representative Mark Kirk (R-Ill.). Danish Foreign Minister Per Stig Møller stressed that aid from Denmark would not end up in the hands of Hamas. Israeli Prime Minister Ehud Olmert said that "Israel supports foreign aid to the Strip, but it is important to build mechanisms and oversight methods to ensure that the aid reaches Gazan civilians and will not be used to strengthen Hamas." Palestinian National Authority President Mahmoud Abbas, of the rival Fatah party, advised international donors to send Gaza reconstruction money directly to property owners, offering a plan that would effectively bypass the territory's Hamas rulers.

Israel and Egypt barring aid transfers
The Gaza Strip is bordered by Israel and Egypt, and much of the humanitarian aid reaches the strip through Israel. According to the Associated Press, "Israel allows in several dozen truckloads of aid every day, but bars the entry of concrete, pipes and other materials that it fears Hamas could seize." Israel says that cement and steel could be used by militants to build rockets and attack tunnels. UN Secretary General Ban Ki-Moon said that opening border crossings was an "indispensable goal," adding that it was "essential to ensure that illegal weapons do not enter Gaza." 
U.S. Secretary of State Hillary Clinton expressed anger at Israeli delays in relaying Gaza aid.

On several occasions during the conflict, Egypt prevented the Muslim Brotherhood from delivering aid to Gaza. On 12 February, Egyptian police seized 2,200 tons of food and medical aid destined for the Gaza Strip and being stored by the group, arresting two of its members. A security official said that the two were accused of illegally storing goods. The Muslim Brotherhood is banned in Egypt.

Obstruction of aid
In June 2009 hundreds of Israeli protestors temporarily blocked goods and humanitarian aid from reaching the Gaza Strip. The protesters, waving signs and carrying posters of 22-year-old kidnapped Israeli soldier Gilad Shalit, cut off the approach to three major crossings into the Gaza Strip while dozens of trucks, loaded with aid, waited outside. 

Israel tightened its blockade of the Gaza Strip stating that it will not remove the blockade until Shalit is freed.

See also
2010 Gaza Strip aid
Coordinator of Government Activities in the Territories COGAT, which admits the aid to Gaza
International aid to Palestinians
International reaction to the 2008–2009 Israel–Gaza conflict
Reaction to 2006 Israel-Gaza conflict
Antisemitic incidents occurring during the 2008–2009 Israel–Gaza conflict
Seven Jewish Children

References

External links
 Alaa Shahine and Alastair Sharp, FACTBOX - Pledges made at Gaza aid conference, Reuters 2 March 2009

Gaza War (2008–2009)
Humanitarian aid